This is a list of U.S. senators and representatives who have taken a clear stand in opposition to the Iraq War.

See also
 List of congressional opponents of the Vietnam War

References 

American people of the Iraq War
Opposition to the Iraq War
Peop